Liopropoma aurora is a species of Perciformes in the family Serranidae.

References 

aurora
Animals described in 1903